Bonavista—Twillingate was a federal electoral district in Newfoundland and Labrador, Canada, that was represented in the House of Commons of Canada from 1949 to 1968.

This riding was created in 1949 when Newfoundland joined the Canadian Confederation.

It was abolished in 1966 when it was redistributed into Bonavista—Trinity—Conception, Burin—Burgeo, Gander—Twillingate and Grand Falls—White Bay—Labrador  ridings.

It initially consisted of the Districts of Twillingate, Fogo, Bonavista North, and Bonavista South excluding any part of the territory within a radius of five miles from the railway station at Gander.

In 1952, it was expanded to include the unorganized territory bounded on the North and West by the District of Grand Falls, on the South by the Districts of Burgeo and LaPoile and Fortune Bay-Hermitage, on the East by the Districts of Trinity North, Bonavista South and Bonavista North.

Members of Parliament

This riding elected the following Members of Parliament:

Election results

See also 

 List of Canadian federal electoral districts
 Past Canadian electoral districts

External links 
 Riding history for Bonavista—Twillingate (1949–1966) from the Library of Parliament

Former federal electoral districts of Newfoundland and Labrador